The 2021–22 Boston College Eagles men's ice hockey team represented Boston College in the 2021–22 NCAA Division I men's ice hockey season. The team was coached by Jerry York, '67, his 28th season behind the bench at Boston College. The Eagles played their home games at Kelley Rink on the campus of Boston College, competing in Hockey East. It was the 100th season of play for the program, and the 38th season in the Hockey East conference.

Previous season recap
The Eagles entered the 2021–22 season following a strong 2020–21 effort. With a 17–6–1 record, going 16–4–1 in conference play, the Eagles finished first in Hockey East for a second straight year and returned to the NCAA tournament for the first time since 2016. Despite clinching the top seed in the conference, no regular season trophy was awarded due to disparate scheduling among the league. The Eagles advanced to the Semifinals of the Hockey East tournament where they fell in double overtime to the UMass Lowell River Hawks. Earning a top seed in the NCAA Northeast Regional, the Eagles fell in the Regional final to the St. Cloud State Huskies. No mid-season tournaments were held due to the COVID-19 pandemic.

Departures

Eleven Eagles departed from the program from the 2020–21 roster:

Graduation:

Adan Farhat, Senior – G 
Logan Hutkso, Senior – F (Signed with his drafted team, the Florida Panthers on March 1, 2021)
Michael Karow, Senior – D (Transferred to Michigan Tech as a Graduate)

Left program early to sign professionally:

Matt Boldy, Sophomore – F (Signed with his drafted team, the Minnesota Wild on March 31, 2021)
Alex Newhook, Sophomore – F (Signed with his drafted team, the Colorado Avalanche on March 31, 2021)
Mike Hardman, Sophomore – F (Signed as a free agent with the Chicago Blackhawks on March 30, 2021)
Spencer Knight, Sophomore – G (Signed with his drafted team, the Florida Panthers on March 31, 2021)

Transferred:

Tim Lovell, Freshman – D (Arizona State)
Jack Agnew, Freshman – D (RPI)
Danny Weight, Freshman – F (Colorado College)
Harrison Roy, Freshman – F (Lake Superior State)

Recruiting
Boston College added six freshmen for the 2021–22 season: four forwards and two defensemen. Additionally, four graduate transfers were added to the roster – three from Bowling Green and one from Penn State – consisting of two forwards, one defenseman and one goalie.

Roster
As of September 6, 2021.

Coaching staff

Standings

Schedule

|-
!colspan=12 ! style=""; | Exhibition

|-
!colspan=12 ! style=""; | Regular Season

|-
!colspan=12 ! style=""; | 

Games against Notre Dame and Harvard, originally scheduled for November 26 and 30, respectively, were postponed due to COVID-19 Protocols within the Eagles men's hockey program. The road game against Notre Dame was rescheduled to January 19 and the home against Harvard to February 1.
The February 25 match against Boston University was postponed to February 27, due to inclement winter weather.

Rankings

Note: USCHO did not release a poll in week 24.

Statistics
As of January 1, 2022

Skaters

Goaltenders

Awards and honors

Hockey East All-Stars
Jack McBain, F – Second Team
Jack St. Ivany, D – Third Team
Marc McLaughlin, F – Honorable Mention

Hockey East Player of the Month
Jack McBain, F – Month of October
Marc McLaughlin, F – Month of December

Hockey East Defender of the Month
Jack St. Ivany, D – Month of December

Hockey East Player of the Week
Marshall Warren, D – Week of October 11, 2021
Jack McBain, F – Week of November 1, 2021 (Shared with Philip Lagunov, Vermont), Week of January 4, 2022 (Shared with Jamie Engelbert, Providence)
Marc McLaughlin, F – Week of December 13, 2021

Hockey East Goaltender of the Week
Henry Wilder, G – Week of January 4, 2022
Eric Dop, G – Week of March 8, 2022

Players drafted into the NHL

2022 NHL Entry Draft

† incoming freshman

References

External links
BC Men's Hockey Home Page
BC Men's Hockey Page on USCHO

2021-22
Boston College Eagles
Boston College Eagles
Boston College Eagles men's ice hockey
Boston College Eagles men's ice hockey
Boston College Eagles men's ice hockey
Boston College Eagles men's ice hockey